Bayt Mahfad, also spelled Bayt Mahfid, is a village in Bani Matar District of Sanaa Governorate, Yemen.

History 
The 10th-century writer al-Hamdani mentions the palaces of Bayt Mahfad along with those of nearby Bayt Hanbas. Writing in 1989, Robert T.O. Wilson said that he was unsure if any remains of the palaces still existed.

References 

Villages in Sanaa Governorate